Andrew Morgan (born 24 March 1934) is a British cross-country skier. He competed at the 1956 Winter Olympics, the 1960 Winter Olympics and the 1964 Winter Olympics.

References

1934 births
Living people
British male cross-country skiers
Olympic cross-country skiers of Great Britain
Cross-country skiers at the 1956 Winter Olympics
Cross-country skiers at the 1960 Winter Olympics
Cross-country skiers at the 1964 Winter Olympics
Sportspeople from Burton upon Trent